Joseph Benedict "Joe" Benedetti (March 28, 1929 – November 19, 2014) was an American politician and lawyer.

Born in Richmond, Virginia, he served in the United States Army in 1946 during the occupation of Japan, the Korean War, and the Berlin Crisis of 1961. He received his bachelor's degree from the College of William & Mary and his law degree from the University of Richmond School of Law. Benedetti practiced law in Richmond, Virginia. He served in the Virginia House of Delegates in 1983 and was a Republican. In 1986, he was elected to the Virginia State Senate and served until 1995. Benedetti was appointed chairman of the Virginia State Board of Corrections and then head of the Virginia Department of Criminal Justice Services. Benedetti died in Richmond, Virginia.

References

External links

1929 births
2014 deaths
Politicians from Richmond, Virginia
College of William & Mary alumni
University of Richmond School of Law alumni
Virginia lawyers
Republican Party members of the Virginia House of Delegates
Republican Party Virginia state senators
Lawyers from Richmond, Virginia